The Liu Clan Shrine is an ancestral shrine in Liouying District, Tainan, Taiwan.

History
The construction of the shrine started in 1867 and completed in 1871.

Architecture
The shrine is housed in a single-story building. The whole complex spans over an area of 2,644 m2. Many of the materials used for the construction of the shrine were imported from Mainland China, excluding the roof tiles. The shrine consists of 16 rooms.

Transportation
The building is accessible within walking distance west of Liuying Station of Taiwan Railways.

See also
 Chinese ancestral veneration
 Beiji Temple
 Grand Matsu Temple
 Taiwan Confucian Temple
 State Temple of the Martial God
 Temple of the Five Concubines
 List of temples in Taiwan
 List of tourist attractions in Taiwan

References

1871 establishments in Taiwan
Ancestral shrines in Taiwan
Buildings and structures in Tainan
Houses completed in 1871